Jalan Lapangan Terbang Sultan Haji Ahmad Shah, Federal Route 420, is a federal road in Kuantan, Pahang, Malaysia. It is a main route to Sultan Haji Ahmad Shah Airport.

The Kilometre Zero is located at Kuantan Bypass junctions.

At most sections, the Federal Route 420 was built under the JKR R5 road standard, with a speed limit of 90 km/h.

List of junctions

References

Malaysian Federal Roads